Saw Mi Pyan (}) was the Queen of the Central Palace of King Htilominlo of the Pagan Dynasty of Myanmar (Burma). The queen, who was a great granddaughter of King Sithu I, had no children.

References

Bibliography
 
 
 

Queens consort of Pagan
13th-century Burmese women